Eau Galle is an unincorporated community located in the town of Eau Galle, in Dunn County, Wisconsin, United States. Eau Galle has a post office with ZIP code 54737.

Meaning of the name
Although Eau Galle is sometimes said to mean "bitter water", 
the name is adapted from the original name for the Eau Galle River: , meaning "(river) with the gravel-bank".

References

Unincorporated communities in Dunn County, Wisconsin
Unincorporated communities in Wisconsin